The 1989 Czechoslovak Open, also known as the Prague Open was a men's tennis tournament played on outdoor clay courts at the I. Czech Lawn Tennis Club in Prague, Czechoslovakia that was part of the 1989 Grand Prix circuit. It was the third edition of the tournament and was held from 7 August until 13 August 1989. Fourth-seeded Marcelo Filippini won the singles title.

Finals

Singles
 Marcelo Filippini defeated  Horst Skoff 7–5, 7–6
 It was Filippini's 1st singles title of the year and the 2nd of his career.

Doubles
 Jordi Arrese /  Horst Skoff defeated  Petr Korda /  Tomáš Šmíd 6–4, 6–4

References

External links
 ITF tournament edition details

Czechoslovak Open
Prague Open (1987–1999)
Czechoslovak Open